Retigeric acid B is a hopanoids chemical compound isolated from Lobaria.

References

Triterpenes
Carboxylic acids
Lichen products